Take My Life is a 1947 British film directed by Ronald Neame, based on the 1947 novel Take My Life by Winston Graham.
The phrase may also refer to:
Take My Life (1942 film), a 1942 American film directed by Leo C. Popkin
"Take My Life", a song by Jeremy Camp from the 2002 album Stay
"Take My Life...Please!", a segment from the first season of the 1980s The Twilight Zone
"Take My Life, Please", an episode of the twentieth season of The Simpsons
"Take My Life, Please!", an episode of the tenth season of CSI: Crime Scene Investigation